Ștefan cel Mare is a commune in Bacău County, Western Moldavia, Romania, named after Stephen the Great. It is composed of six villages: Bogdana, Gutinaș, Negoiești, Rădeana, Ștefan cel Mare and Viișoara. It also included Buciumi and Răcăuți villages until 2005, when they were split off to form Buciumi Commune.

At the 2011 census, 80.2% of inhabitants were Romanians and 19.8% Roma.

Bogdana convent dates to 1660.

References

External links

 Commune council website

Communes in Bacău County
Localities in Western Moldavia